The Pyithu Hluttaw (House of Representatives) is the de jure lower house of the Pyidaungsu Hluttaw, the bicameral legislature of Myanmar (Burma). It consists of 440 members, of which 330 are directly elected through the first-past-the-post system in each townships (the third-level administrative divisions of Myanmar), and 110 are appointed by the Myanmar Armed Forces.

After the 2010 general election, Thura Shwe Mann was elected as the first Speaker of House of Representatives. The last elections to the Pyithu Hluttaw were held in November 2015. At its first meeting on 1 February 2016, Win Myint and T Khun Myat were elected as Speaker and Deputy Speaker of the Pyithu Hluttaw.

As of 8 November 2015, 90% of the members are men (389 members) and 10% women (44 members).

After the coup d'état on 1 February 2021, the Pyidaungsu Hluttaw was dissolved by Acting President Myint Swe, who declared a one-year state of emergency and transferred all legislative powers to Commander-in-Chief of Defence Services Min Aung Hlaing.

Composition

2016–2021

|-
| colspan=2|Total||440|| ||100||100|| ||
|}

Results are as of 20 November 2015.

2011–2016

|-
| colspan=2|Total||440|| ||100||100||20,892,707||

The 3 Pa-O National Organisation candidates ran unopposed.

|-
| colspan=2|Total||440|| ||100||100|| ||

Voting seats by region and state

Notes:

  In Shan state voting the five seats is cancelled

Note: Result as of 20 Nov 2015. Elections in seven townships of Shan State were cancelled due to armed conflicts. Military appointed were not included in this table.

See also
 Politics of Burma
 List of legislatures by country
 Assembly of the Union
 State and Region Hluttaws

References

External links
 

History of Myanmar (1948–present)
Legislatures of Myanmar
Burma
2011 establishments in Myanmar